Moursund may refer to:

Moursund (surname)
Moursund, Texas